These are fictional fairies, pixies, sprites, (etc.), listed in alphabetical order.



A

B

C

D

E

F

G

H

I

J

K

L

M

N

O

P

Q

R

S

T

V

W

Y

Z

External links

References

 
Fairy and sprite
Fairies and sprites in popular culture
Fairies